Jackson Radio Works was a radio broadcasting company in Jackson and Brooklyn, Michigan. In 2004–2005; and 2011, one of its stations, WKHM, won the award of the Michigan Association of Broadcasters "station of the year".

Effective December 12, 2019, Jackson Radio Works sold its station portfolio to McKibbin Media Group for $3.8 million.

List of former stations
WKHM-FM 105.3 FM — “Jackson’s Hit Music” 
WKHM 970 AM & W268CA 101.5 FM — News Talk 
 W270CJ 101.9 FM  — All Sports (Simulcast of WKHM-HD2)
WIBM 1450 & W240DG 95.9 FM The Power Cow  — Country

References

External links
WKHM-FM website
WKHM website
WIBM website
Michiguide Jackson Radio Works info

Defunct radio networks in the United States
Defunct radio stations in the United States